Kusak is a rural locality (a selo) in Nemetsky National District, Altai Krai, Russia. The population was 1,538 as of 2013. There are 6 streets.

Geography 
Kusak is located 5 km west of Galbshtadt (the district's administrative centre) by road. Galbshtadt is the nearest rural locality.

References 

Rural localities in Nemetsky National District